Thomas Coxon (10 June 1883 – 30 January 1942) was an English footballer who played in the English Football League for Burslem Port Vale, Stoke, Middlesbrough, Grimsby Town, and Leyton.

Career
Coxon played for Bradeley, before joining Burslem Port Vale in August 1902. He played two Second Division games in the 1902–03 season, and opened his account for the 1903–04 season with four goals in three games against Preston North End, Bradford City (2), and Grimsby Town. This made an impression on rivals Stoke, who bought him for a £200 fee in October 1903. He scored five goals in 21 First Division games in the rest of the 1903–04 campaign, finding himself in the scoresheet in games with Bury, Blackburn Rovers, The Wednesday, Everton, and Small Heath. However he lost his first team place at the Victoria Ground in the 1904–05 season, playing in just four matches. He was then sold to league rivals Middlesbrough. After spending the 1905–06 season at Ayresome Park, he returned to Burslem Port Vale in May 1906. He was a firm first team regular at the Athletic Ground in the 1906–07 season, scoring 12 goals in 41 league and cup games. Coxon re-signed for Stoke after Vale suffered a financial crisis and went into liquidation at the end of the season. He played twelve matches for the "Potters" in 1907–08, but left for Grimsby Town after Stoke also had severe finical problems and entered liquidation. He scored six goals in 61 Second Division games for the "Mariners", but left Blundell Park after Grimsby were not re-elected to the English Football League in 1909–10. He later played for Leyton and Grimsby Rovers.

Career statistics
Source:

References

1883 births
1942 deaths
Sportspeople from Hanley, Staffordshire
English footballers
Association football wingers
Port Vale F.C. players
Stoke City F.C. players
Middlesbrough F.C. players
Grimsby Town F.C. players
Leyton F.C. players
English Football League players